Mohammad Iqbal Chaudhri was a cricketer who played first-class cricket in Pakistan from 1955 to 1969.

A middle-order batsman and occasional bowler and wicketkeeper, Iqbal Chaudhri was the leading scorer in the 1957–58 Quaid-e-Azam Trophy. He scored 392 runs at an average of 56.00, helping Bahawalpur to win the trophy. In the final, he scored 51 and 38 in Bahawalpur’s victory over Karachi C. 

The rest of his career was only moderately successful. He moved to Sargodha for the 1961-62 season. He made his highest score in his final match, a draw against Multan in 1969-70, when he made 72, which was also the highest score in the match.

References

External links

Year of birth missing (living people)
Living people
Pakistani cricketers
Bahawalpur cricketers
Sargodha cricketers